This is a non-exhaustive list of Albania women's international footballers – association football players who have appeared at least once for the senior Albania women's national football team.

Players

See also 
 Albania women's national football team

References
Notes

Citations

 
Lists of Albania international footballers
Albania
Association football player non-biographical articles